Arlo Smith is a former District Attorney of San Francisco, California. He served from 1980 to 1996, and was defeated in November 1995 by Terence Hallinan. Smith lost to Dan Lungren in the 1990 race for California State Attorney General.

References

Living people
District attorneys in California
Lawyers from San Francisco
Year of birth missing (living people)